Roe Jung-hye (born 1 March 1957) is a South Korean professor of Molecular biology at Seoul National University served as the 6th President of National Research Foundation of Korea - the first woman to lead the Foundation or its preceding foundations from 2018 to 2021.

From 1986 Roe has been teaching at her alma mater receiving full tenure in 1997. She undertook several roles in her university such as the Vice Dean of its College of Natural Sciences and Dean of Office of Research Affairs - the first woman to run the Office. She is also leading its School of Biological Sciences and BK21 programme for Biological Sciences from 2009. Roe has been active in academia as well serving as a member of editorial board of Microbiology from 2007 to 2011, Journal of Bacteriology from 2012 to 2015 and Annual Review of Microbiology from 2012 to 2017.

In addition to academia, Roe has been active in policy making and advisory instruments of the government. Roe was a board member of now-National Research Council of Science & Technology from 2005 to 2008 and a member of Presidential Advisory Council on Science and Technology from 2008 to 2013 to which she has served as an advisor from 2013.

In 2021 Roe's presidency of the National Research Foundation of Korea came to an end making her the first person to complete the Foundation's fixed term of three years. 

Roe is a member of Korean Academy of Science and Technology and a fellow of American Academy of Microbiology.

Roe holds two degrees - a bachelor in Microbiology from Seoul National University and a doctorate in Molecular biology from University of Wisconsin–Madison.

Awards 

 Women Scientist (then-Women Bio-scientist) of the Year (2002) from UNESCO Korea and L'Oréal Korea
 Female Scientist and Technician of the Year (2006) from now-Ministry of Science and ICT
 Korea Science Award (2011)

References 

South Korean biologists
Women biologists
Academic staff of Seoul National University
Seoul National University alumni
University of Wisconsin–Madison College of Letters and Science alumni
1957 births
Living people
South Korean women academics
South Korean government officials